Robert Aurand Moon (April 15, 1917, Williamsport, Pennsylvania, USA – April 10, 2001, Leesburg, Florida, USA), sometimes called "Mr. ZIP", is considered the father of the ZIP Code or Zone Improvement Plan, a mechanism to route mail in the United States.

Biography

The U.S. Postal Service had been providing a premium level "air mail" service since the introduction of regular air transportation. As air transportation reliability improved and cost per gram of mail decreased, it began to make financial sense to transport larger quantities of mail via intercontinental airlines rather than ship, and interstate via the old airmail routes rather than via train. But this made the sorting of mail by hand the new "bottleneck" for mail service. Rather than leisurely hand sorting mail bound for various destinations while passenger trains traveled between town centers, there was a need for machine sorting speed that could match the increased volume traveling between communities by jet and direct trucking.

Rather than being sorted within a city, destined for another city, the structure of delivery had by necessity become sorting at regional sorting centers that were connected by various modes of transport (rail, air and road), with the regional centers responsible for routing mail and packages to each local post office in their region.

In 1944, Moon submitted his idea for the "ZIP Code" while working as a postal inspector in Philadelphia, but no action was taken. Following his third submission of the concept, in 1963 it received the approval of a top-level postal service committee which shares credit for further development of the Zoning Improvement Plan, "ZIP". Mr. Moon's system described the routing to general regions of the country using the first three digits of what would eventually become a five-digit and later a nine-digit system. The next two digits of the first five-digit numeric code would be for smaller delivery areas, and were the work of others. The first Directory of Post Offices using five-digit ZIP code numbers would be published in 1963.

The "Mr. ZIP" cartoon character that was seen on postal delivery vehicles across the United States was originally developed by ad man Harold Wilcox, whose father was a postman. Wilcox's agency, Cunningham & Walsh, originally displayed the image for a Chase Manhattan bank-by-mail campaign.

ZIP codes have been proven to reducing delays and errors in processing mail while allowing increased postal service volume. The impact of the introduction of ZIP codes has led to decreased marketing costs per prospective customer, incrementally lowering costs of goods and services to every person in the country, because businesses can target their advertising and marketing to specific neighborhood demographics.

See also
ZIP Code

References

1917 births
2001 deaths
People from Williamsport, Pennsylvania
Postal codes in the United States